The University of Cambridge is composed of 31 colleges in addition to the academic departments and administration of the central university. Until the mid-19th century, both Cambridge and Oxford comprised a group of colleges with a small central university administration, rather than universities in the common sense. Cambridge's colleges are communities of students, academics and staff – an environment in which generations and academic disciplines are able to mix, with both students and fellows experiencing "the breadth and excellence of a top University at an intimate level".

Cambridge colleges provide most of the accommodation for undergraduates and postgraduates at the university. At the undergraduate level they have responsibility for admitting students to the university, providing pastoral support, and organising elements of their tuition, though lectures and examinations are organised by the faculties and departments of the central university. All degrees are awarded by the university itself, not the colleges, and all students study for the same course regardless of which college they attend. For postgraduate students, research is conducted centrally in the faculties, departments and other university-affiliated research centres, though the colleges provide a central social and intellectual hub for students.

Colleges provide a range of facilities and services to their members in addition to accommodation, including: catering, library facilities, extracurricular societies, and sporting teams. Much of sporting life at Cambridge is centred around college teams and inter-collegiate competition in Cuppers. Student activity is typically organised through separate common rooms for undergraduate and postgraduate students. Another important element of collegiate life is formal hall, which range in frequency from weekly to every night of the week during Full Term.

Colleges also provide funding, accommodation, or both, for some of the academic posts in the university, with the majority of Cambridge academics being a fellow of a college in addition to their faculty/departmental role. Fellows may therefore hold college positions in addition to their academic posts at the university: these include roles such as Tutor (responsible for pastoral support), Director of Studies (responsible for academic oversight of students taking a particular subject), Dean (responsible for discipline among college members), Senior Tutor (responsible for the college's overall academic provision), or Head of college ('Head of House').

Colleges are self-governed charities in their own right, with their own endowments and possessions.

"Old" and "new" colleges
The University of Cambridge has 31 colleges, founded between the 13th and 20th centuries. No colleges were founded between 1596 (Sidney Sussex College) and 1800 (Downing College), which allows the colleges to be distinguished into two groups according to foundation date:
 the 16 "old" colleges, founded between 1284 and 1596, and
 the 15 "new" colleges, founded between 1800 and 1977.

The oldest college is Peterhouse, founded in 1284, and the newest is Robinson, founded in 1977.   Homerton, which was first founded in the eighteenth century as a dissenting academy (and later teacher training college), attained full college status in 2010.

Restrictions on entry
All 16 of the "old" colleges and 7 of the 15 "new" ones admit both male and female students as both undergraduates and postgraduates, without any age restrictions. Eight colleges restrict entry by sex, or by age of undergraduates, or admit only postgraduates:

 King's originally only admitted boys from Eton College until 1865.
 Murray Edwards and Newnham admit only women. Lucy Cavendish admitted only women until 2021;
 Lucy Cavendish admitted only mature students, i.e. aged 21 or older until 2020, or postgraduates until 2021;
 Clare Hall and Darwin admit only postgraduates;
 Hughes Hall, St Edmund's and Wolfson admit only mature students (defined as aged 21 or older) or postgraduates.

No colleges are all-male, although most originally were. Darwin, founded in 1964, was the first mixed college, while in 1972 Churchill, Clare and King's colleges were the first previously all-male colleges to admit women, whilst King's formerly only accepted students from Eton College. The last all-male college to become mixed was Magdalene, in 1988. In 1973 Hughes Hall became the first all-female college to admit men, and Girton first admitted men in 1979.

Newnham also places restrictions on the admission of staff members, allowing only women to become fellows of the college. Murray Edwards does not place this restriction on fellows.

Architectural influence 

The Cambridge and Oxford colleges have served as an architectural inspiration for Collegiate Gothic architecture, used by a number of American universities including Princeton University and Washington University in St. Louis since the late nineteenth century.

List of colleges 

There are also several theological colleges in the city of Cambridge (for example Ridley Hall, Wesley House, Westcott House and Westminster College) that are affiliated with the university through the Cambridge Theological Federation. These colleges, while not officially part of the University of Cambridge, operate programmes that are either validated by or are taught on behalf either of the university or of Anglia Ruskin or Durham Universities.

Heads of colleges

Most colleges are led by a Master, even when the Master is female. However, there are some exceptions, listed below. Girton College has always had a Mistress, even though male candidates have been able to run for the office since 1976.

 Mistress: Girton College
 President: Clare Hall, Hughes Hall, Lucy Cavendish College, Murray Edwards College, Queens' College, Wolfson College
 Principal: Homerton College, Newnham College
 Provost: King's College
 Warden: Robinson College

Also see List of current heads of University of Cambridge colleges.

Former colleges

The above list does not include several former colleges that no longer exist. These include:
Ayerst Hostel, founded in the 1880s, renamed as St Edmund's House in 1896 and later St Edmund's College in 1996.
Buckingham College, founded in 1428 as a Benedictine hall, refounded as Magdalene in 1542.
Bull College, an unofficial college for US GIs returning from World War II, existing in Michaelmas 1945 and Lent 1946.
Cavendish College, founded in 1873, an attempt to allow poorer students to sit the Tripos examinations, whose buildings were bought by Homerton in 1895.
"Clare Hall" was the name of Clare College between 1338 and 1856. Clare College founded a new college named Clare Hall in 1966.
Gonville Hall, founded in 1348, and re-founded in 1557 as Gonville and Caius College.
God's House, founded in 1437, and re-founded in 1505 as Christ's College.
King's Hall, founded in 1317, and combined with Michaelhouse to form Trinity College in 1546.
Michaelhouse, founded in 1324, and combined with King's Hall to form Trinity College in 1546.
New Hall, founded 1954, and re-founded in 2008 as Murray Edwards College
Physwick Hostel, Cambridge - was a predecessor of Gonville and Caius College
University College, founded 1965, and re-founded in 1972 as Wolfson College
University Hall, founded 1326, refounded as Clare Hall in 1338, renamed as Clare College in 1856.

See also
Colleges of Durham University
Colleges of the University of Oxford
Colleges of the University of York
List of current heads of University of Cambridge colleges
List of fictional Cambridge colleges
List of Oxbridge sister colleges

Notes

References 

 
Colleges
Colleges
University of Cambridge-related lists
University of Cambridge